Freilandtheater Bad Windsheim is a theatre in Bavaria, Germany.

External links
Friel and Theater

Theatres in Bavaria